The Port Arthur Marrs were a junior ice hockey team that played in Port Arthur, Ontario (now part of the city of Thunder Bay).  They were named for trucking company and sponsor W.H. Marr, Ltd., and contested the 1967 Memorial Cup, which they lost to the Toronto Marlboros.

History
The Marrs played out of the Thunder Bay Junior Hockey League of Hockey Northwestern Ontario.  They became the Thunder Bay Marrs in 1970 and then the Thunder Bay Case Eagles in 1971.

The North Stars folded on July 6, 1980, when the TBAHA left them with no league to play in.

Season-by-season standings

Playoffs
1971 Won League, Won TBAHA Jack Adams Trophy, Lost Hewitt-Dudley Memorial Trophy semi-final
Thunder Bay Marrs defeated Westfort Hurricanes 4 games to 1 TBJHL CHAMPIONS
Thunder Bay Marrs defeated Fort Frances Royals (Independent) 3 games to none JACK ADAMS TROPHY CHAMPIONS
Thunder Bay Marrs defeated Sudbury Wolves (NOJHA) 4 games to 3
Charlottetown Islanders (MJAHL) defeated Thunder Bay Marrs 4 games to 1
1972 DNQ
1973 Lost Final
Fort William Canadians defeated Thunder Bay Eagles 3 games to none
1974 Lost TBAHA semi-final
Thunder Bay Hurricanes (MWJHL) defeated Thunder Bay Eagles 3 games to none
1975 Won League, Lost Hewitt-Dudley Memorial Trophy semi-final
Thunder Bay Eagles defeated Fort William Canadians 4 games to 2
Thunder Bay Eagles defeated Thunder Bay Hurricanes 4 games to 1 TBJHL CHAMPIONS
Guelph CMC's (SOJHL) defeated Thunder Bay Eagles 4 games to 1
1976 Won League, Lost Hewitt-Dudley Memorial Trophy quarter-final
Thunder Bay Eagles defeated Fort William Canadians 4 games to none
Thunder Bay Eagles defeated Thunder Bay Beavers 4 games to none TBJHL CHAMPIONS
Guelph Platers (SOJHL) defeated Thunder Bay Eagles 4 games to 1
1977 Won League, Won TBAHA Jack Adams Trophy, Lost Hewitt-Dudley Memorial Trophy semi-final
Thunder Bay Eagles defeated Fort William Canadians 3 games to none
Thunder Bay Eagles defeated Degagne Hurricanes 4 games to 1 TBJHL CHAMPIONS
Thunder Bay Eagles defeated Thunder Bay Blades 4 games to none JACK ADAMS TROPHY CHAMPIONS
North York Rangers (OPJHL) defeated Thunder Bay Eagles 4 games to 1
1978 DNQ
1979 Won League, Lost Dudley Hewitt Cup Semi-final
Thunder Bay North Stars defeated Rural Voyageurs 3 games to none
Thunder Bay North Stars defeated Degagne Buccaneers 4 games to 1 TBJHL CHAMPIONS
Guelph Platers (OPJHL) defeated Thunder Bay North Stars 4 games to none
1980 Won League, Lost Dudley Hewitt Cup Semi-final
Thunder Bay North Stars defeated Degagne Buccaneers 4 games to none with 1 tie TBJHL CHAMPIONS
North York Rangers (OPJHL) defeated Thunder Bay North Stars 4 games to none

Championships
TBJHL Champions:
1932, 1933, 1935, 1937, 1940, 1941, 1944, 1946, 1956, 1962, 1965, 1967, 1971, 1975, 1976, 1977, 1979, 1980
Abbott Cup Champions:
1967
Abbott Cup Finalists:
1944, 1956
Memorial Cup Finalists:
1967

Notable alumni
Juniors
Lee Fogolin, Sr.
Fred Page
Flyers
Steve Black
Ray Ceresino
Steve Hrymnak
Pentti Lund
Calum MacKay
Rudy Migay
Dennis Olson
Benny Woit
North Stars
John Adams
Bruce Gamble
Stu McNeill
Dennis Olson
Ralph Stewart
Gary Veneruzzo
PA Marrs
John Adams
Bill Fairbairn
Gerry Hart
Bob Kelly
Vic Venasky
Juha Widing
TB Marrs
Lee Fogolin Jr.
Nelson Pyatt

References

External links
Hockey Thunder Bay website
SIJHL website

Ice hockey teams in Ontario
Hockey Northwestern Ontario